Paul Cranmer  (born November 27, 1969) is a former Canadian football player who played two seasons in the CFL with the Saskatchewan Roughriders and Toronto Argonauts. He was selected by the Saskatchewan Roughriders in the fourth found of the 1993 CFL Draft. Cranmer played college football at Grand Valley State University.  He is the son of halfback Dave Cranmer.

External links
1993 CFL Draft
Just Sports Stats

Living people
1969 births
Canadian football slotbacks
Players of Canadian football from Alberta
Grand Valley State Lakers football players
Saskatchewan Roughriders players
Toronto Argonauts players
Canadian football people from Calgary